Saša Vegri (true name Albina Vodopivec, née Doberšek) (12 February 1934 – 29 August 2010) was a Slovene poet who is also known for her books for young readers.

Vegri was born in Belgrade in 1934. In 1941 her family returned to Sveti Štefan and she went to school in Celje and Ljubljana. She worked as a freelance writer and a librarian. She first published her poetry in various journals in the mid-1950s. At the same time she started writing for children and young adults.

She won the Levstik Award in 1979 for her work Mama pravi, da v očkovi glavi (Mum Said that in Dad's Head).

Published works

Poetry for adults
 Mesečni konj (The Moon Horse), 1958 
 Naplavljeni plen (the Washed Up Loot), 1961
 Zajtrkujem v urejenem naročju (I Take My Breakfast in My Tidy Lap), 1967
 Ofelija in trojni aksel (Ophelia and the Triple Axel), 1977
 Konstelacije (Constellations), 1980

Poetry for children
 Jure Kvak-Kvak (George Quack-Quack), 1975
 Mama pravi, da v očkovi glavi (Mum Said that in Dad's Head), 1978
 To niso pesmi za otroke ali kako se dela otroke (These Are Not Poems For Children Or on How You make Children), 1983 
 Kaj se zgodi, če kdo ne spi (What Can Happen If One Doesn't Sleep), 1991

References

Slovenian women poets
Slovenian poets
Slovenian children's writers
1934 births
2010 deaths
Levstik Award laureates
Writers from Belgrade
Slovenian women children's writers
20th-century Serbian poets
20th-century women writers